The 2015 Ogasawara earthquake was a  7.8 magnitude earthquake which struck offshore  Japan 189 km (117 mi) west northwest of Chichi-jima in the Ogasawara Islands on May 30 at a depth of 664.0 km (412.6 mi). The shaking of the earthquake was observed almost all over Japan, as it  was one of the largest deep-focus earthquakes recorded worldwide.

Damage and casualties
The Associated Press agency reported "twelve people suffered minor injuries", and TEPCO stated that 400 customers lost electricity in Saitama Prefecture. There were no deaths, but elevators stopped working in Tokyo and elsewhere.

See also 
 List of earthquakes in 2015
 List of earthquakes in Japan

References 

2015 earthquakes
May 2015 events in Japan
2015 Ogasawara earthquake